Miguel Carlos Francisco Alvarez del Toro (23 August 1917–2 August 1996) was a Mexican biologist who worked in the state of Chiapas as head of the Institute of Natural History. He was the first Mexican conservationist.

Career
He was born in Colima, and later travelled to Mexico City with his family. He worked there as the director of a natural history museum. He was later hired by the government of Chiapas and moved to that state. Due to his close contact and friendship with politicians he became prominent and well-funded. He was married to Clementina Pérez.

Alvarez del Toro is the author of the following books: Los Reptiles de Chiapas (1960), Los Crocodylia de México (1974), Los Animales Silvestres de Chiapas (1952), ¡Así era Chiapas! (1985), Las Aves de Chiapas (1971), Arañas de Chiapas (1992), Chiapas y su biodiversidad (1993), and Comitán, una puerta al sur (1994).

Legacy
The Zoológico Miguél Álvarez del Toro (ZOOMAT), a zoo, is named after him.

CIPAMEX, the Society for Study and Conservation of Mexican Birds, named a medal in his honor. It is given to ornithologists who have done a life's work for birds. 

Environmentalist group Fundación Chiapaneca Miguel Alvarez del Toro para la Proteccion de la Naturaleza is also named after him.

The following species have been named after him:
Cryptotriton alvarezdeltoroi – Alvarez del Toro's hidden salamander
Anolis alvarezdeltoroi
Coniophanes alvarezi – Chiapan stripeless snake
Trogolaphysa toroi
Pulex alvarezi
Lepidophyma alvarezi = Lepidophyma tuxtlae
Ceratozamia alvarezii
Mastophora alvareztoroi
Bipes alvarezi = Bipes canaliculatus

References

Further reading
"Miguel Alvarez del Toro," in Tom Taylor and Michael Taylor, Aves: A Survey of the Literature of Neotropical Ornithology, Baton Rouge: Louisiana State University Libraries, 2011.

1917 births
1996 deaths
Mexican naturalists
20th-century Mexican zoologists
People from Colima